This list of birds of Florida includes species documented in the U.S. state of Florida and accepted by the Florida Ornithological Society Records Committee (FOSRC). As of November 2022, there were 539 species included in the official list. Of them, 168 species and eight identifiable subspecies are classed as accidental, 18 have been introduced to North America, four are extinct, and one has been extirpated. More than 100 "verifiable...exotic species [are] found free-flying in the wild" according to the FOSRC. Additional accidental species have been added from different sources.

This list is presented in the taxonomic sequence of the Check-list of North and Middle American Birds, 7th edition through the 62nd Supplement, published by the American Ornithological Society (AOS). Common and scientific names are also those of the Check-list, except that the common names of families are from the Clements taxonomy because the AOS list does not include them.

The following status codes have been used to annotate some species:

(A) Accidental - a species that occurs rarely or accidentally in Florida, and for which the FOSRC requests a full report for verification
(I) Introduced - a species that has been introduced to North America by the actions of humans, either directly or indirectly, and has become established in Florida 
(E) Extinct - a recent bird that no longer exists
(e) Extirpated - a species that is no longer in Florida, but exists elsewhere

Ducks, geese, and waterfowl

Order: AnseriformesFamily: Anatidae

The family Anatidae includes the ducks and most duck-like waterfowl, such as geese and swans. These birds are adapted to an aquatic existence with webbed feet, flattened bills, and feathers that are excellent at shedding water due to special oils.

Black-bellied whistling-duck, Dendrocygna autumnalis
Fulvous whistling-duck, Dendrocygna bicolor
Snow goose, Anser caerulescens
Ross's goose, Anser rossii
Greater white-fronted goose, Anser albifrons
Brant, Branta bernicla (A)
Cackling goose, Branta hutchinsonii (A)
Canada goose, Branta canadensis
Tundra swan, Cygnus columbianus (A)
Egyptian goose, Alopochen aegyptiaca (I)
Muscovy duck, Cairina moschata (I)
Wood duck, Aix sponsa
Blue-winged teal, Spatula discors
Cinnamon teal, Spatula cyanoptera
Northern shoveler, Spatula clypeata
Gadwall, Mareca strepera
Eurasian wigeon, Mareca penelope
American wigeon, Mareca americana
Mallard, Anas platyrhynchos
American black duck, Anas rubripes 
Mottled duck, Anas fulvigula
White-cheeked pintail, Anas bahamensis (A)
Northern pintail, Anas acuta
Green-winged teal, Anas crecca
Common teal, A. c. crecca (A)
Canvasback, Aythya valisineria
Redhead, Aythya americana
Ring-necked duck, Aythya collaris
Greater scaup, Aythya marila
Lesser scaup, Aythya affinis
King eider, Somateria spectabilis (A)
Common eider, Somateria mollissima
Harlequin duck, Histrionicus histrionicus (A)
Surf scoter, Melanitta perspicillata
White-winged scoter, Melanitta deglandi
Black scoter, Melanitta americana
Long-tailed duck, Clangula hyemalis
Bufflehead, Bucephala albeola
Common goldeneye, Bucephala clangula
Hooded merganser, Lophodytes cucullatus
Common merganser, Mergus merganser (A)
Red-breasted merganser, Mergus serrator
Masked duck, Nomonyx dominicus (A)
Ruddy duck, Oxyura jamaicensis

New World quail
Order: GalliformesFamily: Odontophoridae

The New World quails are small, plump terrestrial birds only distantly related to the quails of the Old World, but named for their similar appearance and habits.

Northern bobwhite, Colinus virginianus

Pheasants, grouse, and allies
Order: GalliformesFamily: Phasianidae

The Phasianidae is the family containing the pheasants and their allies. These are terrestrial birds, variable in size but generally plump, with broad, relatively short wings. Many are gamebirds or have been domesticated as a food source for humans.

Wild turkey, Meleagris gallopavo

Flamingoes
Order: PhoenicopteriformesFamily: Phoenicopteridae

Flamingos filter-feed on shellfish and algae. Their oddly shaped beaks are adapted to separate mud and silt from the food they consume and, uniquely, are used upside-down.

American flamingo, Phoenicopterus ruber

Grebes

Order: PodicipediformesFamily: Podicipedidae

Grebes are small to medium-large freshwater diving birds. They have lobed toes and are excellent swimmers and divers. However, they have their feet placed far back on the body, making them quite ungainly on land.

Least grebe, Tachybaptus dominicus (A)
Pied-billed grebe, Podilymbus podiceps
Horned grebe, Podiceps auritus
Red-necked grebe, Podiceps grisegena (A)
Eared grebe, Podiceps nigricollis
Western grebe, Aechmorphorus occidentalis (A)

Pigeons and doves

Order: ColumbiformesFamily: Columbidae

Pigeons and doves are stout-bodied birds with short necks, and short slender bills with a fleshy cere.

Rock pigeon, Columba livia (I)
Scaly-naped pigeon, Patagioenas squamosa (A)
White-crowned pigeon, Patagioenas leucocephala
Band-tailed pigeon, Patagioenas fasciata (A)
Eurasian collared-dove, Streptopelia decaocto (I)
Passenger pigeon, Ectopistes migratorius (E)
Inca dove, Columbina inca (A)
Common ground dove, Columbina passerina
Ruddy ground dove, Columbina talpacoti (A)
Blue-headed quail-dove, Starnoenas cyanocephala (A)
Ruddy quail-dove, Geotrygon montana (A)
Key West quail-dove, Geotrygon chrysia (A)
White-tipped dove, Leptotila verreauxi (A)
White-winged dove, Zenaida asiatica
Zenaida dove, Zenaida aurita (A)
Mourning dove, Zenaida macroura

Cuckoos

Order: CuculiformesFamily: Cuculidae

The family Cuculidae includes cuckoos, roadrunners, and anis. These birds are of variable size with slender bodies, long tails, and strong legs.

Smooth-billed ani, Crotophaga ani
Groove-billed ani, Crotophaga sulcirostris
Dark-billed cuckoo, Coccyzus melacoryphus (A)
Yellow-billed cuckoo, Coccyzus americanus
Mangrove cuckoo, Coccyzus minor
Black-billed cuckoo, Coccyzus erythropthalmus

Nightjars and allies

Order: CaprimulgiformesFamily: Caprimulgidae

Nightjars are medium-sized nocturnal birds that usually nest on the ground. They have long wings, short legs, and very short bills. Most have small feet, of little use for walking, and long pointed wings. Their soft plumage is cryptically colored to resemble bark or leaves.

Lesser nighthawk, Chordeiles acutipennis
Common nighthawk, Chordeiles minor
Antillean nighthawk, Chordeiles gundlachii
Chuck-will's-widow, Antrostomus carolinensis
Eastern whip-poor-will, Antrostomus vociferus

Swifts
Order: ApodiformesFamily: Apodidae

The swifts are small birds, spending most of their lives flying. They have very short legs and never settle voluntarily on the ground, perching instead only on vertical surfaces. Many swifts have very long swept-back wings which resemble a crescent or boomerang.

White-collared swift, Streptoprocne zonaris (A)
Chimney swift, Chaetura pelagica
Vaux's swift, Chaetura vauxi (A)
White-throated swift, Aeronautes saxatalis (A)
Antillean palm-swift, Tachornis phoenicobia (A)

Hummingbirds

Order: ApodiformesFamily: Trochilidae

Hummingbirds are small birds capable of hovering in mid-air due to the rapid flapping of their wings. They are the only birds that can fly backwards.

Bahama woodstar, Calliphlox evelynae (A)
Green-breasted mango, Anthracothorax prevostii (A)
Ruby-throated hummingbird, Archilochus colubris
Black-chinned hummingbird, Archilochus alexandri
Anna's hummingbird, Calypte anna (A)
Costa's hummingbird, Calypte costae (A)
Calliope hummingbird, Selasphorus calliope (A)
Rufous hummingbird, Selasphorus rufus
Allen's hummingbird, Selasphorus sasin (A)
Broad-tailed hummingbird, Selasphorus platycercus (A)
Broad-billed hummingbird, Cynanthus latirostris (A)
White-eared hummingbird, Basilinna leucotis (A)
Antillean crested hummingbird, Orthorhyncus cristatus (A)
Buff-bellied hummingbird, Amazila yucatanensis

Rails, gallinules, and coots

Order: GruiformesFamily: Rallidae

The Rallidae is a large family of small to medium-sized birds which includes the rails, crakes, coots, and gallinules. The most typical family members occupy dense vegetation in damp environments near lakes, swamps, or rivers. In general they are shy and secretive, making them difficult to observe. Most have strong legs with long toes, short rounded wings, and are weak fliers.

Clapper rail, Rallus crepitans
King rail, Rallus elegans
Virginia rail, Rallus limicola
Sora, Porzana carolina
Common gallinule, Gallinula galeata
American coot, Fulica americana
Purple gallinule, Porphyrio martinicus
Purple swamphen, Porphyrio poliocephalus (I)
Yellow rail, Coturnicops noveboracensis (A)
Black rail, Laterallus jamaicensis

Limpkin
Order: GruiformesFamily: Aramidae

The limpkin is an odd bird that looks like a large rail, but is skeletally closer to the cranes. It is found in marshes with some trees or scrub in the Caribbean, South America, and southern Florida.

Limpkin, Aramus guarauna

Cranes

Order: GruiformesFamily: Gruidae

Cranes are large, tall birds with long legs and long necks. Unlike the similar-looking but un-related herons, cranes fly with necks extended. Most have elaborate and noisy courtship displays or "dances". When in a group, they may also "dance" for no particular reason, jumping up and down in an elegant manner, seemingly just for pleasure or to attract a mate.

Sandhill crane, Antigone canadensis
Whooping crane, Grus americana (reintroduced)

Stilts and avocets
Order: CharadriiformesFamily: Recurvirostridae

Recurvirostridae is a family of large wading birds which includes the avocets and stilts. The avocets have long legs and long up-curved bills. The stilts have extremely long legs and long, thin, straight bills.

Black-necked stilt, Himantopus mexicanus
American avocet, Recurvirostra americana

Oystercatchers
Order: CharadriiformesFamily: Haematopodidae

The oystercatchers are large, conspicuous, and noisy plover-like birds, with strong bills used for smashing or prising open molluscs.

American oystercatcher, Haematopus palliatus

Lapwings and plovers

Order: CharadriiformesFamily: Charadriidae

The family Charadriidae includes the plovers, dotterels, and lapwings. They are small to medium-sized birds with compact bodies, short thick necks, and long, usually pointed, wings. They are generally found in open country, mostly in habitats near water.

Southern lapwing, Vanellus chilensis (A)
Northern lapwing, Vanellus vanellus (A)
Black-bellied plover, Pluvialis squatarola
American golden-plover, Pluviali dominicas 
Pacific golden-plover, Pluvialis fulva (A)
Killdeer, Charadrius vociferus
Semipalmated plover, Charadrius semipalmatus
Piping plover, Charadrius melodus
Lesser sand-plover, Charadrius mongolus (A)
Greater sand-plover, Charadrius leschenaultii (A)
Wilson's plover, Charadrius wilsonia
Snowy plover, Charadrius nivosus
Mountain plover, Charadrius montanus (A)

Jacanas
Order: CharadriiformesFamily: Jacanidae

The jacanas are a family of waders found worldwide within the tropical zone. They are identifiable by their huge feet and claws which enable them to walk on floating vegetation in the shallow lakes that are their preferred habitat.

Northern jacana, Jacana spinosa (A)

Sandpipers and allies

Order: CharadriiformesFamily: Scolopacidae

Scolopacidae is a large and diverse family of small to medium-sized shorebirds which includes the sandpipers, curlews, godwits, shanks, tattlers, woodcocks, snipes, dowitchers, and phalaropes. Most eat small invertebrates picked out of the mud or sand. Different lengths of legs and bills enable multiple species to feed in the same habitat, particularly on the coast, without direct competition for food.

Upland sandpiper, Bartramia longicauda
Whimbrel, Numenius phaeopus
Long-billed curlew, Numenius americanus
Bar-tailed godwit, Limosa lapponica (A)
Black-tailed godwit, Limosa limosa (A)
Hudsonian godwit, Limosa haemastica 
Marbled godwit, Limosa fedoa
Ruddy turnstone, Arenaria interpres
Red knot, Calidris canutus
Surfbird, Calidris virgata (A)
Ruff, Calidris pugnax 
Sharp-tailed sandpiper, Calidris acuminata (A)
Stilt sandpiper, Calidris himantopus
Curlew sandpiper, Calidris ferruginea (A)
Red-necked stint, Calidris ruficollis (A)
Sanderling, Calidris alba
Dunlin, Calidris alpina
Purple sandpiper, Calidris maritima
Baird's sandpiper, Calidris bairdii
Least sandpiper, Calidris minutilla
White-rumped sandpiper, Calidris fuscicollis
Buff-breasted sandpiper, Calidris subruficollis
Pectoral sandpiper, Calidris melanotos
Semipalmated sandpiper, Calidris pusilla
Western sandpiper, Calidris mauri
Short-billed dowitcher, Limnodromus griseus
Long-billed dowitcher, Limnodromus scolopaceus
American woodcock, Scolopax minor
Wilson's snipe, Gallinago delicata
Spotted sandpiper, Actitis macularius
Solitary sandpiper, Tringa solitaria
Gray-tailed tattler, Tringa brevipes (A)
Lesser yellowlegs, Tringa flavipes
Willet, Tringa semipalmata
Common greenshank, Tringa nebularia (A)
Greater yellowlegs, Tringa melanoleuca
Wilson's phalarope, Phalaropus tricolor
Red-necked phalarope, Phalaropus lobatus
Red phalarope, Phalaropus fulicarius

Skuas and jaegers

Order: CharadriiformesFamily: Stercorariidae

Skuas are medium to large seabirds, typically with gray or brown plumage, often with white markings on the wings. They have longish bills with hooked tips and webbed feet with sharp claws. They look like large dark gulls, but have a fleshy cere above the upper mandible. They are strong, acrobatic fliers.

South polar skua, Stercorarius maccormicki (A)
Pomarine jaeger, Stercorarius pomarinus
Parasitic jaeger, Stercorarius parasiticus
Long-tailed jaeger, Stercorarius longicaudus

Auks, murres, and puffins
Order: CharadriiformesFamily: Alcidae

Alcids are superficially similar to penguins due to their black-and-white colors, their upright posture, and some of their habits; however they are not closely related to penguins and are (with one extinct exception) able to fly. Auks live on the open sea, only deliberately coming ashore to breed.

Dovekie, Alle alle (A)
Common murre, Uria aalge (A)
Thick-billed murre, Uria lomvia (A)
Razorbill, Alca torda (A)
Long-billed murrelet, Brachyrampus perdix (A)
Ancient murrelet, Synthliboramphus antiquus (A)
Atlantic puffin, Fratercula arctica (A)

Gulls, terns, and skimmers

Order: CharadriiformesFamily: Laridae

The Laridae are a family of medium to large seabirds and containing the gulls, terns, kittiwakes, and skimmers. They are typically gray or white, often with black markings on the head or wings. They have stout, longish bills and webbed feet.

Black-legged kittiwake, Rissa tridactyla (A)
Sabine's gull, Xema sabini 
Bonaparte's gull, Chroicocephalus philadelphia
Gray-hooded gull, Chroicocephalus cirrocephhalus (A)
Black-headed gull, Chroicocephalus ridibundus (A)
Little gull, Hydrocoleus minutus (A)
Laughing gull, Leucophaeus atricilla
Franklin's gull, Leucophaeus pipixcan
Belcher's gull, Larus belcheri (A)
Black-tailed gull, Larus crassirostris (A)
Heermann's gull, Larus heermanni (A)
Ring-billed gull, Larus delawarensis
California gull, Larus californicus (A)
Herring gull, Larus argentatus
"Vega gull", L. a. vega (A)
Iceland gull, Larus glaucoides
"Nominate Iceland gull", L. g. glaucoides (A)
Thayer's gull, L. g. thayeri (A)
Lesser black-backed gull, Larus fuscus
Slaty-backed gull, Larus schistisagus (A)
Glaucous gull, Larus hyperboreus
Great black-backed gull, Larus marinus
Kelp gull, Larus dominicanus (A)
Brown noddy, Anous stolidus
Black noddy, Anous minutus
Sooty tern, Onychoprion fuscata
Bridled tern, Onychoprion anaethetus
Least tern, Sternula antillarum
Gull-billed tern, Gelochelidon nilotica
Caspian tern, Hydroprogne caspia
Black tern, Chlidonias niger
Roseate tern, Sterna dougallii
Common tern, Sterna hirundo
Arctic tern, Sterna paradisaea
Forster's tern, Sterna forsteri
Royal tern, Thalasseus maxima
Sandwich tern, Thalasseus sandvicensis
"Cayenne tern", T. s. eurygnathus (A)
Elegant tern, Thalasseus elegans (A)
Black skimmer, Rynchops niger

Tropicbirds
Order: PhaethontiformesFamily: Phaethontidae

Tropicbirds are slender white birds of tropical oceans with exceptionally long central tail feathers. Their long wings have black markings, as does the head.

White-tailed tropicbird, Phaethon lepturus
Red-billed tropicbird, Phaeton aethereus (A)

Loons
Order: GaviiformesFamily: Gaviidae

Loons are aquatic birds the size of a large duck, to which they are unrelated. Their plumage is largely gray or black and they have spear-shaped bills. Loons swim well and fly adequately but, because their legs are placed towards the rear of the body, are clumsy on land.

Red-throated loon, Gavia stellata
Pacific loon, Gavia pacifica (A)
Common loon, Gavia immer

Albatrosses
Order: ProcellariiformesFamily: Diomedeidae

Albatrosses are among the largest of flying birds, and the great albatrosses from the genus Diomedea have the largest wingspans of any extant birds.

Yellow-nosed albatross, Thalassarche chlororhynchos (A)

Southern storm-petrels

Order: ProcellariiformesFamily: Oceanitidae

The storm-petrels are the smallest seabirds, relatives of the petrels, feeding on planktonic crustaceans and small fish picked from the surface, typically while hovering. The flight is fluttering and sometimes bat-like. Until 2018, this family's three species were included with the other storm-petrels in family Hydrobatidae.

Wilson's storm-petrel, Oceanites oceanicus

Northern storm-petrels
Order: ProcellariiformesFamily: Hydrobatidae

Though the members of this family are similar in many respects to the southern storm-petrels, including their general appearance and habits, there are enough genetic differences to warrant their placement in a separate family.

European storm-petrel, Hydrobates pelagicus (A)
Leach's storm-petrel, Hydrobates leucorhous
Band-rumped storm-petrel, Hydrobates castro

Shearwaters and petrels

Order: ProcellariiformesFamily: Procellariidae

The procellariids are the main group of medium-sized "true petrels", characterized by united tubular nostrils with a median septum.

Northern fulmar, Fulmarus glacialis (A)
Black-capped petrel, Pterodoma hasitata
Fea's petrel, Pterodroma feae (A)
Bulwer's petrel, Bulweria bulwerii (A)
Cory's shearwater, Calonectris diomedea
Wedge-tailed shearwater, Ardenna pacifica (A)
Short-tailed shearwater, Ardenna tenuirostris (A)
Sooty shearwater, Ardenna griseus
Great shearwater, Ardenna gravis
Manx shearwater, Puffinus puffinus (A)
Audubon's shearwater, Puffinus lherminieri

Storks
Order: CiconiiformesFamily: Ciconiidae

Storks are large, heavy, long-legged, long-necked wading birds with long stout bills and wide wingspans. They lack the powder down that other wading birds such as herons, spoonbills and ibises use to clean off fish slime. Storks lack a pharynx and are mute.

Wood stork, Mycteria americana

Frigatebirds
Order: SuliformesFamily: Fregatidae

Frigatebirds are large seabirds usually found over tropical oceans. They are large, black, or black-and-white, with long wings and deeply forked tails. The males have colored inflatable throat pouches. They do not swim or walk and cannot take off from a flat surface. Having the largest wingspan-to-body-weight ratio of any bird, they are essentially aerial, able to stay aloft for more than a week.

Magnificent frigatebird, Fregata magnificens

Boobies and gannets

Order: SuliformesFamily: Sulidae

The sulids comprise the gannets and boobies. Both groups are medium-large coastal seabirds that plunge-dive for fish.

Masked booby, Sula dactylatra
Brown booby, Sula leucogaster
Red-footed booby, Sula sula (A)
Northern gannet, Morus bassanus

Anhingas
Order: SuliformesFamily: Anhingidae

Anhingas, also known as darters or snakebirds, are cormorant-like water birds with long necks and long, straight beaks. They are fish eaters, diving for long periods, and often swim with only their neck above the water, looking rather like a water snake.

Anhinga, Anhinga anhinga

Cormorants and shags
Order: SuliformesFamily: Phalacrocoracidae

Cormorants are medium-to-large aquatic birds, usually with mainly dark plumage and areas of colored skin on the face. The bill is long, thin, and sharply hooked. Their feet are four-toed and webbed.

Great cormorant, Phalacrocorax carbo (A)
Double-crested cormorant, Nannopterum auritum
Neotropic cormorant, Nannopterum brasilianum

Pelicans
Order: PelecaniformesFamily: Pelecanidae

Pelicans are very large water birds with a distinctive pouch under their beak. Like other birds in the order Pelecaniformes, they have four webbed toes.

American white pelican, Pelecanus erythrorhynchos
Brown pelican, Pelecanus occidentalis

Herons, egrets, and bitterns

Order: PelecaniformesFamily: Ardeidae

The family Ardeidae contains the herons, egrets, and bitterns. Herons and egrets are wading birds with long necks and legs. Herons are large and egrets are smaller. The cattle egret or "cow bird" is seen amongst flocks of cattle, for instance in ranches north of the Everglades. A bird will often attach itself to a particular bull, cow or calf, even being tolerated perching on the back or even the head of the animal. The birds are more shy than the animals, and will fly away if approached. The birds feed on various items turned over by the cattle as they graze and tramp the ground. Bitterns tend to be shorter necked and more secretive. Unlike other long-necked birds such as storks, ibises, and spoonbills, members of the Ardeidae fly with their necks pulled back into a curve.

American bittern, Botaurus lentiginosus
Least bittern, Ixobrychus exilis
Great blue heron, Ardea herodias
Great egret, Ardea alba
Snowy egret, Egretta thula
Little blue heron, Egretta caerulea
Tricolored heron, Egretta tricolor
Reddish egret, Egretta rufescens
Cattle egret, Bubulcus ibis
Green heron, Butorides virescens
Black-crowned night-heron, Nycticorax nycticorax
Yellow-crowned night-heron, Nyctanassa violacea

Ibises and spoonbills
Order: PelecaniformesFamily: Threskiornithidae

The family Threskiornithidae includes the ibises and spoonbills. They have long, broad wings. Their bodies are elongated, the neck more so, with long legs. The bill is also long, curved downward in the ibises, straight and markedly flattened in the spoonbills.

White ibis, Eudocimus albus
Scarlet ibis, Eudocimus ruber (A)
Glossy ibis, Plegadis falcinellus
White-faced ibis, Plegadis chihi
Roseate spoonbill, Platalea ajaja

New World vultures
Order: CathartiformesFamily: Cathartidae

New World vultures are not closely related to Old World vultures, but superficially resemble them because of convergent evolution. Like the Old World vultures, they are scavengers. Unlike Old World vultures, which find carcasses by sight, New World vultures have a good sense of smell with which they locate carcasses. The turkey vulture has a red head. The black vulture has a grey head. Although not a water bird, a flock of black vultures at the Myakka River State Park, southeast of Sarasota, has been seen bathing at the edge of the lake and then drying out their wings in the same way as cormorants like the Florida anhinga. This habit may help free them of parasites.

Black vulture, Coragyps atratus
Turkey vulture, Cathartes aura

Osprey
Order: AccipitriformesFamily: Pandionidae

Pandionidae is a family of fish-eating birds of prey possessing a very large, powerful hooked beak for tearing flesh from their prey, strong legs, powerful talons, and keen eyesight. The family is monotypic.

Osprey, Pandion haliaetus

Hawks, eagles, and kites

Order: AccipitriformesFamily: Accipitridae

Accipitridae is a family of birds of prey that includes hawks, eagles, kites, harriers, and Old World vultures. They have very large, hooked beaks for tearing flesh from their prey, strong legs, powerful talons, and keen eyesight.

White-tailed kite, Elanus leucurus
Hook-billed kite, Chondrohierax uncinatus (A)
Swallow-tailed kite, Elanoides forficatus
Golden eagle, Aquila chrysaetos (A)
Double-toothed kite, Harpagus bidentatus (A)
Northern harrier, Circus hudsonius
Sharp-shinned hawk, Accipiter striatus
Cooper's hawk, Accipiter cooperii
Northern goshawk, Accipiter gentilis (A)
Bald eagle, Haliaeetus leucocephalus
Mississippi kite, Ictinia mississippiensis
Snail kite, Rostrhamus sociabilis
Great black hawk, Buteogallus urubitinga (A)
Red-shouldered hawk, Buteo lineatus
Broad-winged hawk, Buteo platypterus
Short-tailed hawk, Buteo brachyurus
Swainson's hawk, Buteo swainsoni
Zone-tailed hawk, Buteo albonotatus (A)
Red-tailed hawk, Buteo jamaicensis
Harlan's hawk, B. j. harlani 
Rough-legged hawk, Buteo lagopus (A)
Ferruginous hawk, Buteo regalis (A)

Barn-owls
Order: StrigiformesFamily: Tytonidae

Barn-owls are medium to large owls with large heads and characteristic heart-shaped faces. They have long strong legs with powerful talons.

Barn owl, Tyto alba

Owls
Order: StrigiformesFamily: Strigidae

Typical owls are small to large solitary nocturnal birds of prey. They have large forward-facing eyes and ears, a hawk-like beak, and a conspicuous circle of feathers around each eye called a facial disk.

Flammulated owl, Psiloscops flammeolus (A)
Eastern screech-owl, Megascops asio
Great horned owl, Bubo virginianus
Snowy owl, Bubo scandiacus (A)
Burrowing owl, Athene cunicularia
Barred owl, Strix varia
Long-eared owl, Asio otus (A)
Stygian owl, Asio stygius (A)
Short-eared owl, Asio flammeus
Northern saw-whet owl, Aegolius acadicus (A)

Kingfishers
Order: CoraciiformesFamily: Alcedinidae

Kingfishers are medium-sized birds with large heads, long pointed bills, short legs, and stubby tails.

Ringed kingfisher, Megaceryle torquata (A)
Belted kingfisher, Megaceryle alcyon

Woodpeckers

Order: PiciformesFamily: Picidae

Woodpeckers are small to medium-sized birds with chisel-like beaks, short legs, stiff tails, and long tongues used for capturing insects. Some species have feet with two toes pointing forward and two backward, while several species have only three toes. Many woodpeckers have the habit of tapping noisily on tree trunks with their beaks.

Red-headed woodpecker, Melanerpes erythrocephalus
Golden-fronted woodpecker, Melanerpes aurifrons (A)
Red-bellied woodpecker, Melanerpes carolinus
Yellow-bellied sapsucker, Sphyrapicus varius
Downy woodpecker, Dryobates pubescens
Red-cockaded woodpecker, Dryobates borealis
Hairy woodpecker, Dryobates villosus
Northern flicker, Colaptes auratus
Pileated woodpecker, Dryocopus pileatus
Ivory-billed woodpecker, Campephilus principalis (considered (E) by FOSRC)

Falcons and caracaras
Order: FalconiformesFamily: Falconidae

The Falconidae is a family of diurnal birds of prey containing the falcons and caracaras. They differ from hawks, eagles, and kites in that they kill with their beaks instead of their talons.

Crested caracara, Caracara plancus
Eurasian kestrel, Falco tinnunculus (A)
American kestrel, Falco sparverius
"Cuban American kestrel", F. s. sparveroides (A)
Merlin, Falco columbarius
Peregrine falcon, Falco peregrinus

New World and African parrots
Order: PsittaciformesFamily: Psittacidae

Characteristic features of parrots include a strong curved bill, an upright stance, strong legs, and clawed zygodactyl feet. Many parrots are vividly colored, and some are multi-colored. Most of the more than 150 species in this family are found in the New World.

Monk parakeet, Myiopsitta monachus (I)
Carolina parakeet, Conuropsis carolinensis (E)
Nanday parakeet, Aratinga nenday (I)
Mitred parakeet, Psittacara mitratus (I)
White-winged parakeet, Brotogeris versicolurus (I)

Old World parrots
Order: PsittaciformesFamily: Psittaculidae

Characteristic features of parrots include a strong curved bill, an upright stance, strong legs, and clawed zygodactyl feet. Many parrots are vividly colored, and some are multi-colored. Old World parrots are found from Africa east across south and southeast Asia and Oceania to Australia and New Zealand.

Budgerigar, Melopsittacus undulatus (I) (e) ("Disestablished" per the FOSRC)

Tyrant flycatchers

Order: PasseriformesFamily: Tyrannidae

Tyrant flycatchers are passerines which occur throughout North and South America. They superficially resemble the Old World flycatchers, but are more robust and have stronger bills. They do not have the sophisticated vocal capabilities of the songbirds. Most, but not all, are rather plain. As the name implies, most are insectivorous.

Elaenia species, Elaenia sp. (A)
Ash-throated flycatcher, Myiarchus cinerascens
Great crested flycatcher, Myiarchus crinitus
Brown-crested flycatcher, Myiarchus tyrannulus
Great kiskadee, Pitangus sulphuratus (A) 
La Sagra's flycatcher, Myiarchus sagrae (A)
Sulphur-bellied flycatcher, Myiodynastes luteiventris (A)
Piratic flycatcher, Empidonomus leucophaius (A)
Variegated flycatcher, Empidonomus varius (A)
Tropical kingbird, Tyrannus melancholicus
Cassin's kingbird, Tyrannus vociferans (A)
Western kingbird, Tyrannus verticalis
Eastern kingbird, Tyrannus tyrannus
Gray kingbird, Tyrannus dominicensis
Loggerhead kingbird, Tyrannus caudifasciatus (A)
Scissor-tailed flycatcher, Tyrannus forficatus
Fork-tailed flycatcher, Tyrannus savana (A)
Olive-sided flycatcher, Contopus cooperi
Western wood-pewee, Contopus sordidulus (A)
Eastern wood-pewee, Contopus virens
Cuban pewee, Contopus cariibaeus (A)
Yellow-bellied flycatcher, Empidonax flaviventris (A)
Acadian flycatcher, Empidonax virescens
Alder flycatcher, Empidonax alnorum 
Willow flycatcher, Empidonax traillii (A)
Least flycatcher, Empidonax minimus
Hammond's flycatcher, Empidonax hammondii (A)
Pacific-slope flycatcher, Empidonax difficilis (A)
Black phoebe, Sayornis nigricans (A)
Eastern phoebe, Sayornis phoebe
Say's phoebe, Sayornis saya (A)
Vermilion flycatcher, Pyrocephalus rubinus

Vireos, shrike-babblers, and erpornis

Order: PasseriformesFamily: Vireonidae

The vireos are a group of small to medium-sized passerines. They are typically greenish in color and resemble wood warblers apart from their heavier bills.

White-eyed vireo, Vireo griseus
Thick-billed vireo, Vireo crassirostris 
Cuban vireo, Vireo gundlachii (A)
Bell's vireo, Vireo bellii
Yellow-throated vireo, Vireo flavifrons
Blue-headed vireo, Vireo solitarius
Philadelphia vireo, Vireo philadelphicus
Warbling vireo, Vireo gilvus
Red-eyed vireo, Vireo olivaceus
Yellow-green vireo, Vireo flavoviridis (A)
Black-whiskered vireo, Vireo altiloquus

Shrikes
Order: PasseriformesFamily: Laniidae

Shrikes are passerines known for their habit of catching other birds and small animals and impaling the uneaten portions of their bodies on thorns. A shrike's beak is hooked, like that of a typical bird of prey.

Loggerhead shrike, Lanius ludovicianus

Crows, jays, and magpies

Order: PasseriformesFamily: Corvidae

The family Corvidae includes crows, ravens, jays, choughs, magpies, treepies, nutcrackers, and ground jays. Corvids are above average in size among the Passeriformes and some of the larger species show high levels of intelligence.

Blue jay, Cyanocitta cristata
Florida scrub-jay, Aphelocoma coerulescens
American crow, Corvus brachyrhynchos
Fish crow, Corvus ossifragus

Tits, chickadees, and titmice
Order: PasseriformesFamily: Paridae

The Paridae are mainly small stocky woodland species with short stout bills. Some have crests. They are adaptable birds, with a mixed diet including seeds and insects.

Carolina chickadee, Poecile carolinensis
Tufted titmouse, Baeolophus bicolor

Larks
Order: PasseriformesFamily: Alaudidae

Larks are small terrestrial birds with often extravagant songs and display flights. Most larks are fairly dull in appearance. Their food is insects and seeds.

Horned lark, Eremophila alpestris

Swallows

Order: PasseriformesFamily: Hirundinidae

The family Hirundinidae is adapted to aerial feeding. They have a slender streamlined body, long pointed wings, and a short bill with a wide gape. The feet are adapted to perching rather than walking, and the front toes are partly joined at the base.

Bank swallow, Riparia riparia
Tree swallow, Tachycineta bicolor
Bahama swallow, Tachycineta cyaneovirdis (A)
Violet-green swallow, Tachycineta thalassina (A)
Mangrove swallow, Tachycineta albilinea (A)
Northern rough-winged swallow, Stelgidopteryx serripennis
Brown-chested martin, Progne tapera (A)
Purple martin, Progne subis
Southern martin, Progne elegans (A)
Cuban martin, Progne cryptoleuca (A)
Caribbean martin, Progne dominicensis (A)
Barn swallow, Hirundo rustica
Cliff swallow, Petrochelidon pyrrhonota
Cave swallow, Petrochelidon fulva

Bulbuls
Order: PasseriformesFamily: Pycnonotidae

The bulbuls are a family of medium-sized songbirds native to Africa and tropical Asia. They are noisy and gregarious and often have beautiful songs.

Red-whiskered bulbul, Pycnonotus jocosus (I)

Kinglets
Order: PasseriformesFamily: Regulidae

The kinglets are a small family of birds which resemble the titmice. They are very small insectivorous birds. The adults have colored crowns, giving rise to their name.

Ruby-crowned kinglet, Corthylio calendula
Golden-crowned kinglet, Regulus satrapa

Waxwings
Order: PasseriformesFamily: Bombycillidae

The waxwings are a group of birds with soft silky plumage and unique red tips to some of the wing feathers. In the Bohemian and cedar waxwings, these tips look like sealing wax and give the group its name. These are arboreal birds of northern forests. They live on insects in summer and berries in winter.

Cedar waxwing, Bombycilla cedrorum

Nuthatches
Order: PasseriformesFamily: Sittidae

Nuthatches are small woodland birds. They have the unusual ability to climb down trees head first, unlike most other birds which can only go upwards. Nuthatches have big heads, short tails, and powerful bills and feet.

Red-breasted nuthatch, Sitta canadensis
White-breasted nuthatch, Sitta carolinensis
Brown-headed nuthatch, Sitta pusilla

Treecreepers
Order: PasseriformesFamily: Certhiidae

Treecreepers are small woodland birds, brown above and white below. They have thin pointed down-curved bills, which they use to extricate insects from bark. They have stiff tail feathers, like woodpeckers, which they use to support themselves on vertical trees.

Brown creeper, Certhia americana

Gnatcatchers
Order: PasseriformesFamily: Polioptilidae

The family Polioptilidae is a group of small insectivorous passerine birds containing the gnatcatchers and gnatwrens.

Blue-gray gnatcatcher, Polioptila caerulea

Wrens

Order: PasseriformesFamily: Troglodytidae

Wrens are small and inconspicuous birds, except for their loud songs. They have short wings and thin down-turned bills. Several species often hold their tails upright. All are insectivorous.

Rock wren, Salpinctes obsoletus (A) 
House wren, Troglodytes aedon
Winter wren, Troglodytes hyemalis
Sedge wren, Cistothorus platensis
Marsh wren, Cistothorus palustris
Carolina wren, Thryothorus ludovicianus
Bewick's wren, Thryomanes bewickii (A)

Mockingbirds and thrashers

Order: PasseriformesFamily: Mimidae

The mimids are a family of passerine birds which includes thrashers, mockingbirds, tremblers, and the New World catbirds. They are notable for their vocalization, especially their remarkable ability to mimic a wide variety of birds and other sounds heard outdoors. The species tend towards dull grays and browns in their appearance.

Gray catbird, Dumetella carolinensis
Curve-billed thrasher, Toxostoma curvirostre (A)
Brown thrasher, Toxostoma rufum
Sage thrasher, Oreoscoptes montanus (A)
Bahama mockingbird, Mimus gundlachii 
Northern mockingbird, Mimus polyglottos

Starlings
Order: PasseriformesFamily: Sturnidae

Starlings are small to medium-sized passerines with strong feet. Their flight is strong and direct and they are very gregarious. Their preferred habitat is open country, and they eat insects and fruit. Their plumage is typically dark with a metallic sheen.

European starling, Sturnus vulgaris (I)
Common myna, Acridotheres tristis (I)

Thrushes and allies

Order: PasseriformesFamily: Turdidae

The thrushes are a group of passerine birds that occur mainly but not exclusively in the Old World. They are plump, soft plumaged, small to medium-sized insectivores or sometimes omnivores, often feeding on the ground. Many have attractive songs.

Eastern bluebird, Sialia sialis
Mountain bluebird, Sialia currucoides (A)
Townsend's solitaire, Myadestes townsendi (A)
Veery, Catharus fuscescens
Gray-cheeked thrush, Catharus minimus
Bicknell's thrush, Catharus bicknelli (A)
Swainson's thrush, Catharus ustulatus
Hermit thrush, Catharus guttatus
Wood thrush, Hylocichla mustelina
American robin, Turdus migratorius
Red-legged thrush, Turdus plumbeus (A)
Varied thrush, Ixoreus naevius (A)

Old World flycatchers
Order: PasseriformesFamily: Muscicapidae

The Old World flycatchers are a large family of small passerine birds. These are mainly small arboreal insectivores, many of which, as the name implies, take their prey on the wing.

European robin, Erithacus rubecula (A)
Northern wheatear, Oenanthe oenanthe (A)

Waxbills and allies
Order: PasseriformesFamily: Estrildidae

The estrildid finches are small passerine birds native to the Old World tropics. They are gregarious and often colonial seed eaters with short thick but pointed bills. They are all similar in structure and habits, but have wide variation in plumage colors and patterns.

Scaly-breasted munia, Lonchura punctulata (I) 
Tricolored munia, Lonchura malacca (I)

Old World sparrows
Order: PasseriformesFamily: Passeridae

Old World sparrows are small passerine birds. In general, sparrows tend to be small plump brownish or grayish birds with short tails and short powerful beaks. Sparrows are seed eaters, but they also consume small insects.

House sparrow, Passer domesticus (I)

Wagtails and pipits
Order: PasseriformesFamily: Motacillidae

Motacillidae is a family of small passerine birds with medium to long tails. They include the wagtails, longclaws, and pipits. They are slender, ground-feeding insectivores of open country.

Eastern yellow wagtail, Motacilla tschutschensis (A)
White wagtail, Motacilla alba (A)
American pipit, Anthus rubescens
Sprague's pipit, Anthus spragueii (A)

Finches, euphonias, and allies

Order: PasseriformesFamily: Fringillidae

Finches are seed-eating passerines. They are small to moderately large and have strong, usually conical and sometimes very large, beaks. All have twelve tail feathers and nine primaries. They have a bouncing flight with alternating bouts of flapping and gliding on closed wings, and most sing well.

Evening grosbeak, Coccothraustes vespertinus (A)
House finch, Haemorhous mexicanus (I) (native to the southwestern U.S; introduced in the east)
Purple finch, Haemorhous purpureus
Common redpoll, Acanthis flammea (A)
Red crossbill, Loxia curvirostra (A)
Pine siskin, Spinus pinus
Lesser goldfinch, Spinus psaltria (A)
American goldfinch, Spinus tristis

Longspurs and snow buntings
Order: PasseriformesFamily: Calcariidae

The Calcariidae are a group of passerine birds that had traditionally been grouped with the New World sparrows, but differ in a number of respects and are usually found in open grassy areas.

Lapland longspur, Calcarius lapponicus (A)
Chestnut-collared longspur, Calcarius ornatus (A)
Smith's longspur, Calcarius pictus (A)
Snow bunting, Plectrophenax nivalis (A)

New World sparrows

Order: PasseriformesFamily: Passerellidae

Until 2017, these species were considered part of the family Emberizidae. Most of the species are known as sparrows, but these birds are not closely related to the Old World sparrows which are in the family Passeridae. Many of these have distinctive head patterns.

Bachman's sparrow, Peucaea aestivalis
Grasshopper sparrow, Ammodramus savannarum
Florida grasshopper sparrow, A. s. floridanus
Black-throated sparrow, Amphispiza bilineata (A)
Lark sparrow, Chondestes grammacus
Lark bunting, Calamospiza melanocorys (A)
Chipping sparrow, Spizella passerina
Clay-colored sparrow, Spizella pallida
Field sparrow, Spizella pusilla
Fox sparrow, Passerella iliaca
American tree sparrow, Spizelloides arborea (A)
Dark-eyed junco, Junco hyemalis
"Oregon junco", J. h. oreganus group (A)
White-crowned sparrow, Zonotrichia leucophrys
Golden-crowned sparrow, Zonotrichia atricapilla (A)
Harris's sparrow, Zonotrichia querula (A)
White-throated sparrow, Zonotrichia albicollis
Vesper sparrow, Pooecetes gramineus
LeConte's sparrow, Ammospiza leconteii
Seaside sparrow, Ammospiza maritima
Dusky seaside sparrow, A. m. nigrescens (E)
Nelson's sparrow, Ammospiza nelsoni
Saltmarsh sparrow, Ammospiza caudacta
Henslow's sparrow, Centronyx henslowii
Savannah sparrow, Passerculus sandwichensis
Song sparrow, Melospiza melodia
Lincoln's sparrow, Melospiza lincolnii
Swamp sparrow, Melospiza georgiana
Green-tailed towhee, Pipilo chlorurus (A)
Spotted towhee, Pipilo maculatus (A)
Eastern towhee, Pipilo erythrophthalmus

Spindalises
Order: PasseriformesFamily: Spindalidae

The members of this small family, newly recognized in 2017, are native to the Greater Antilles. One species occurs fairly frequently in Florida.

Western spindalis, Spindalis zena

Yellow-breasted chat
Order: PasseriformesFamily: Icteriidae

This species was historically placed in the wood-warblers (Parulidae) but nonetheless most authorities were unsure if it belonged there. It was placed in its own family in 2017.

Yellow-breasted chat, Icteria virens

Troupials and allies

Order: PasseriformesFamily: Icteridae

The icterids are a group of small to medium-sized, often colorful, passerines restricted to the New World, including the grackles, New World blackbirds and New World orioles. Most have black as a predominant plumage color, often enlivened by yellow, orange or red.

Yellow-headed blackbird, Xanthocephalus xanthocephalus
Bobolink, Dolichonyx oryzivorus
Eastern meadowlark, Sturnella magna
Western meadowlark, Sturnella neglecta (A)
Orchard oriole, Icterus spurius
Hooded oriole, Icterus cucullatus (A)
Bullock's oriole, Icterus bullockii 
Spot-breasted oriole, Icterus pectoralis (I)
Baltimore oriole, Icterus galbula
Scott's oriole, Icterus parisorum (A)
Red-winged blackbird, Agelaius phoeniceus
Tawny-shouldered blackbird, Agelaius umeralis (A)
Shiny cowbird, Molothrus bonariensis
Bronzed cowbird, Molothrus aeneus
Brown-headed cowbird, Molothrus ater
Rusty blackbird, Euphagus carolinus
Brewer's blackbird, Euphagus cyanocephalus
Common grackle, Quiscalus quiscula
Boat-tailed grackle, Quiscalus major

New World warblers

Order: PasseriformesFamily: Parulidae

The wood warblers are a group of small, often colorful, passerines restricted to the New World. Most are arboreal, but some are terrestrial. Most members of this family are insectivores.

Ovenbird, Seiurus aurocapilla
Worm-eating warbler, Helmitheros vermivorum
Louisiana waterthrush, Parkesia motacilla
Northern waterthrush, Parkesia noveboracensis
Bachman's warbler, Vermivora bachmanii (E)
Golden-winged warbler, Vermivora chrysoptera
Blue-winged warbler, Vermivora cyanoptera
Black-and-white warbler, Mniotilta varia
Prothonotary warbler, Protonotaria citrea
Swainson's warbler, Limnothlypis swainsonii
Tennessee warbler, Leiothlypis peregrina
Orange-crowned warbler, Leiothlypis celata
Nashville warbler, Leiothlypis ruficapilla
Connecticut warbler, Oporornis agilis
MacGillivray's warbler, Geothlypis tolmiei (A)
Mourning warbler, Geothlypis philadelphia (A)
Kentucky warbler, Geothlypis formosa
Common yellowthroat, Geothlypis trichas
Hooded warbler, Setophaga citrina
American redstart, Setophaga ruticilla
Kirtland's warbler, Setophaga kirtlandii (A)
Cape May warbler, Setophaga tigrina
Cerulean warbler, Setophaga cerulea
Northern parula, Setophaga americana
Magnolia warbler, Setophaga magnolia
Bay-breasted warbler, Setophaga castanea
Blackburnian warbler, Setophaga fusca
Yellow warbler, Setophaga petechia
Chestnut-sided warbler, Setophaga pensylvanica
Blackpoll warbler, Setophaga striata
Black-throated blue warbler, Setophaga caerulescens
Palm warbler, Setophaga palmarum
Pine warbler, Setophaga pinus
Yellow-rumped warbler, Setophaga coronata
"Audubon's warbler", S. c. auduboni (A)
Yellow-throated warbler, Setophaga dominica
Prairie warbler, Setophaga discolor
Black-throated gray warbler, Setophaga nigrescens (A)
Townsend's warbler, Setophaga townsendi (A)
Hermit warbler, Setophaga occidentalis (A)
Golden-cheeked warbler, Setophaga chrysoparia (A)
Black-throated green warbler, Setophaga virens
Canada warbler, Cardellina canadensis
Wilson's warbler, Cardellina pusilla

Cardinals and allies

Order: PasseriformesFamily: Cardinalidae

The cardinals are a family of robust, seed-eating birds with strong bills. They are typically associated with open woodland. The sexes usually have distinct plumages.

Summer tanager, Piranga rubra
Scarlet tanager, Piranga olivacea
Western tanager, Piranga ludoviciana
Northern cardinal, Cardinalis cardinalis
Rose-breasted grosbeak, Pheucticus ludovicianus
Black-headed grosbeak, Pheucticus melanocephalus (A)
Blue grosbeak, Passerina caerulea
Lazuli bunting, Passerina amoena (A)
Indigo bunting, Passerina cyanea
Varied bunting, Passerina versicolor (A)
Painted bunting, Passerina ciris
Dickcissel, Spiza americana

Tanagers and allies
Order: PasseriformesFamily: Thraupidae

The tanagers are a large group of small to medium-sized passerine birds restricted to the New World, mainly in the tropics. Many species are brightly colored. As a family they are omnivorous, but individual species specialize in eating fruits, seeds, insects, or other types of food. Most have short, rounded wings.

Bananaquit, Coereba flaveola (A)
Red-legged honeycreeper, Cyanerpes cyaneus (A)
Yellow-faced grassquit, Tiaris olivacea (A)
Black-faced grassquit, Tiaris bicolor (A)

Notable exotics
The following introduced species, while not considered officially established by the FOSRC, have self-sustaining populations and, within range and proper habitat, are likely to be encountered.

Mandarin duck, Aix galericulata (I)
Red junglefowl, Gallus gallus (I - Key West)
Common peafowl, Pavo cristatus (I)
Blue-and-yellow macaw, Ara araruana (I)

Notes

References

See also
List of North American birds
List of birds of Everglades National Park
List of birds of Dry Tortugas National Park
List of invasive species in the Everglades
List of amphibians of Florida
Reptiles of Florida

External links
Florida Ornithological Society
Non-native birds according to Florida Fish and Wildlife Conservation Commission
Pictures of birds of Florida

Birds
Florida